Euphyia is a genus of moths in the family Geometridae erected by Jacob Hübner in 1825.

Species
 Euphyia adumbraria (Herrich-Schäffer, 1852)
 Euphyia biangulata (Haworth, 1809) – cloaked carpet
 Euphyia chalusata Wiltshire, 1970
 Euphyia cineraria (Butler, 1878)
 Euphyia coangulata (Prout, 1938)
 Euphyia frustata (Treitschke, 1828)
 Euphyia implicata (Guenée, 1857)
 Euphyia intermediata (Guenée, 1858) – sharp-angled carpet
 Euphyia khorassana Brandt, 1941
 Euphyia mesembrina (Rebel, 1927)
 Euphyia minima Cassino & Swett, 1922
 Euphyia scripturata (Hübner, 1799)
 Euphyia sintenisi (Staudinger, 1892)
 Euphyia swetti Cassino, 1927
 Euphyia unangulata (Haworth, 1809) – sharp-angled carpet

References

 
Xanthorhoini